The 1955–56 NBA season was the Lakers' eighth season playing in the NBA.

Regular season

Season standings

x – clinched playoff spot

Record vs. opponents

Game log

Playoffs

|- align="center" bgcolor="#ccffcc"
| 1
| March 16
| @ St. Louis
| W 103–97
| Slater Martin (28)
| Kiel Auditorium
| 1–0
|-

|- align="center" bgcolor="#ffcccc"
| 1
| March 17
| @ St. Louis
| L 115–116
| Mikkelsen, Martin (19)
| Kiel Auditorium
| 0–1
|- align="center" bgcolor="#ccffcc"
| 2
| March 19
| St. Louis
| W 133–75
| Slater Martin (19)
| Minneapolis Auditorium
| 1–1
|- align="center" bgcolor="#ffcccc"
| 3
| March 21
| St. Louis
| L 115–116
| Clyde Lovellette (31)
| Minneapolis Auditorium
| 1–2
|-

Awards and records
 Slater Martin, All-NBA Second Team
 Clyde Lovellette, All-NBA Second Team
 Slater Martin, NBA All-Star Game
 Clyde Lovellette, NBA All-Star Game
 Vern Mikkelsen, NBA All-Star Game

References

Los Angeles Lakers seasons
Minneapolis
Minneapolis Lakers
Minneapolis Lakers